Bani Murir is a sub-district located in the Shar'ab ar-Rawnah District, Taiz Governorate, Yemen. Bani Murir had a population of 4,888 according to the 2004 census.

References

Sub-districts in Shar'ab ar-Rawnah District